Bottom dealing or base dealing is a sleight of hand technique in which the bottom card from a deck of playing cards is dealt instead of the top card. It is used by magicians as a type of card illusion, and by card sharps and mechanics, and as a method of cheating in poker or other card games.

The deck is typically held in a modified mechanic's grip in the dealer's non-dominant hand. The dealer slides the top card partially off the deck as if to deal it, while the dominant hand instead takes hold of the bottom card. The card is snapped away from the deck while the top card is reset.

Unless the dealer is particularly skilled at bottom dealing, the technique produces a slightly different sound from standard dealing, and the second-to-bottom card may be drawn slightly out of place. This is called a "hanger."

Bottom dealing and second dealing both have application in performance magic.

Bottom dealing experts include Persi Diaconis, Darwin Ortiz, Steve Forte, Daniel Madison, Jason England and Richard Turner.

In Popular Culture
 In the movie Rounders, Worm is caught dealing off the bottom of the deck.  The police officer who accuses him says "This son-of-a-bitch is base dealing.  Caught a hanger, Sarge."  They discover that Worm's partner, Mike, has A's and 7's as his first four cards, and the card on the bottom of the deck is an Ace.

See also
 Card manipulation
 Cheating in poker
 Second dealing
 Card marking

Notes

References
 John Nevil Maskelyne, Sharps and Flats. 

Card game terminology
Card magic
Card tricks
Cheating in gambling